The National Insurance number is a number used in the United Kingdom in the administration of the National Insurance or social security system.  It is also used for some purposes in the UK tax system.

The number is sometimes referred to as a NI No or NINO.

Allocation of number
Shortly before a person's 16th birthday, HM Revenue and Customs (HMRC) notifies them of their NI number.

In 1993, a one-off mass allocation of NI numbers was made to all children under the age of 16 whose parents were in receipt of Child Benefit.  As a result of this, siblings who met the criteria above were allocated NI numbers sequentially.

People from abroad who wish to work in the UK, or those to whom a number was not initially allocated as children, must apply for a number through the Department for Work and Pensions (DWP).

Format
The format of the number is two prefix letters, six digits and one suffix letter. An example is QQ123456C.

Neither of the first two letters can be D, F, I, Q, U or V. The second letter also cannot be O. The prefixes BG, GB, NK, KN, TN, NT and ZZ are not allocated. Validation lists of issued two-letter prefixes are published from time to time.

Since 2009, the last two digits determine the day of the week on which various social security benefits are payable and when unemployed claimants need to attend their Jobcentre to sign on (renew their claims): 00 to 19 for Monday, 20 to 39 for Tuesday, 40 to 59 for Wednesday, 60 to 79 for Thursday and 80 to 99 for Friday.

In official electronic submissions, the final letter may be represented by a space if not known.

The Northern Ireland National Insurance scheme is funded and administered separately from the scheme in Great Britain but operates identically so that, in practice, the same rules apply throughout the United Kingdom.

History
Until 1975, the suffixes A, B, C and D at the end of the NI number signified the period of validity of the National Insurance cards originally used to collect National Insurance contributions (NICs). Cards were exchanged every twelve months and because of the very large numbers of cards issued the exchange was staggered. 

Suffix A cards ran from March of one year until March of the next when they were exchanged for a new one. Suffix B suffix cards ran from June until the following June, suffix C from September until the following September and suffix D from December until the following December. For example, a B stagger card issued in 1955 might have run from the first Monday in June that year until the first Sunday in June the following year. 

This staggered system operated from 5 July 1948 until 1975, at which time the A stagger cards were extended to run an extra five weeks, until 5 April 1975, in line with the end of the tax year. The B, C and D stagger NI Cards had a shorter period of validity in their final year and ran from June, September and December respectively in 1974 until 6 April 1975. From 6 April 1975 onwards, a computerised National Insurance Recording System (NIRS) was used to allocate all NICs by tax years.

In Great Britain, expired NI cards were sorted into one hundred separate groups corresponding to the final two numbers of the NI number and were posted to the individual insured person's NI account (the RF1) by the corresponding one hundred ledger sections at the Records Branch of the Central Office of the Ministry of National Insurance and its successors . 

These sections dealt not only with the recording of NI contributions but with requests for information about qualifying contributions necessary to pay sickness, unemployment, widows, and other benefits and also with any correspondence arising from those NI accounts and NI cards. Within each of the sections, NI numbers were allocated among 16 splits with one clerk administering each split. To trace unknown NI numbers, a general index contained millions of small RF2 index slips, filed in order of surname and listing the name(s), date of birth, and NI number for every person within the National Insurance scheme.

Temporary numbers
Until April 2001, employers sometimes allocated their employees a temporary insurance number, which followed the format , where 'TN' stands for temporary number and is static and x is M for male, F for female, or P for pensioner and the numbers in the midsection were the employee's date of birth. In the case of a woman born on 31 December 1958, for example, the temporary NI number would have been . Temporary NI numbers could not be used to trace back any NI credits or personal details. Since 2001 the National Insurance number must be obtained – the temporary code must not now be used.

Another type of temporary NI number is the Revenue-issued Temporary Reference Number (TRN) used when HMRC is unable to trace a taxpayer's original NI number. It follows the format 63T12345.

Administrative numbers
Reference numbers similar in format to NI numbers are sometimes allocated for tax or benefit purposes with special prefix letters.  Special prefixes used now or in the past include the letters OO (for Tax Credit claims), CR (for investigations), FY (formerly for Attendance Allowance claims, named after the Fylde social security office where claims were processed), MW (used from 1980 to 1987 for migrant workers), NC (formerly for Stakeholder Pensions), PP (for use by pension schemes as PP999999P), and PY or PZ (both used for tax-only accounts created prior to 2003).

Numbercards
Prior to 1984, when a person was allocated an NI number, a manila notification card was issued to them. From 1984 until 2011, they received a plastic 'numbercard', of similar proportions to a credit card, with the number raised on the front. The card was only used as a reminder of the number; it was not needed to start work, and was not considered a valid identity card.  Numbercards were phased out after September 2010 and their issue ceased in October 2011. NI numbers are now notified by letter.

Crown dependencies
National Insurance numbers issued in the Isle of Man hold the prefix MA. Similarly, those issued in Jersey start with JY, and those issued in Guernsey hold the prefix GY. Only Channel Island NINOs issued prior to 1975 are validated, and recognised for UK use by HMRC.

Use for tax purposes
The National Insurance number is used as a reference number in the Pay As You Earn system, and also by the self-employed.  It is also used in applications for Individual Savings Accounts (ISAs), to check that an individual has opened only one ISA in a tax year.

However, the NI number is not used universally as a tax identification number.  Taxpayers who need to file a tax return are given a different number, a Unique Taxpayer Reference (UTR), which is used as a reference number in the self-assessment tax system.

Use for identification
NI numbers are sometimes used for identification purposes in other contexts which have nothing to do with their original National Insurance purpose – such as forming part of evidence of right to work in the UK, or as the account number with a credit union. The NI card, however, is not proof of identity.

See also
Social Security number (SSN) and Individual Taxpayer Identification Number (ITIN) - U.S. equivalents
Social insurance number (SIN) - Canadian equivalent

Notes

References

External links

UK Government Data Standards Catalogue - National Insurance Number - The official UK government definition of the NI number format. Also includes links to the XML Schema data type definition in the CitizenIdentificationTypes schema published by the Office of the e-Envoy.
Format and Security: What a NINO looks like HM Revenue & Customs official page
 Where Is My UTR Number? Information about UTR Number.

National identification numbers
Taxation in the United Kingdom
Social security in the United Kingdom
Number